FMC may refer to:

Places

Facilities
 Five Mile Airport (formerly: Five Mile Camp Airport), in Alaska, United States
 Magdeburg–Cochstedt Airport, in Germany

Government and politics 
 Federal Magistrates Court, in Australia
 Federal Maritime Commission, a regulatory agency of the United States federal government
 Federal Medical Center, part of the United States Bureau of Prisons
 Federation of Cuban Women, part of the Communist Party of Cuba
 Forward Markets Commission, part of the Indian Ministry of Finance
 Force Mobile Command, a former name of the Canadian Army

Industry 
 Fairbanks, Morse and Company, a former American heavy industry
 FMC Corporation, an American chemical manufacturing company
FMC Dockyard, Bangladeshi shipbuilding company
 FMC Technologies, an American machinery and oil services technology company
 Ford Motor Company, an American automotive manufacturer
 Future Mobility Corporation, a Chinese automotive manufacturer

Media 
 Fair Media Council, an American media advocacy organization
 Family Movie Channel, in Australia
 Fox Movie Channel, in the United States
 Full Metal Challenge, a British television program

Medicine
 Fludarabine-Mitoxantrone-Cyclophosphamide chemotherapy, a variation of FCM (chemotherapy)
 Faridpur Medical College, in Bangladesh
 Federal Medical Centres, in Nigeria
 Flinders Medical Centre, in Adelaide, South Australia
 Foothills Medical Centre, in Calgary, Alberta, Canada
 Fresenius Medical Care, a German medical supply company
 Frontier Medical College, in Pakistan

Sport
 Full Members' Cup, a defunct English football competition
 Monegasque Cycling Federation
 Mexican Cycling Federation

Science and technology
 Fixed–mobile convergence
 Flexible metallic conduit
 Flight management computer
 Fluoromethcathinone
 FPGA Mezzanine Card
 Fundamental modeling concepts
 Flash memory controller

Other companies
 Fellows Morton & Clayton, a defunct British canal transportation company
 First Manhattan Co., an American financial services company
 Fraser Milner Casgrain a Canadian law firm

Other organizations
 Federated Mountain Clubs of New Zealand, an environmental protection organization
 Friday Morning Club, a defunct American women's organization
 Future of Music Coalition, an American music education and research organization
 Magna Carta (Italy), an Italian think tank

Other uses
 15-minute city
 Free Methodist Church
 Franklin & Marshall College